John Jackson (born January 16, 1989) is a professional boxer from the Virgin Islands, who competed in the 2008 Summer Olympics at welterweight. He challenged once for the WBC super welterweight title in 2016.

In 2022, Jackson was convicted of raping a 15-year old girl and producing child pornography.

Family
John Jackson is the brother of light-heavyweight boxer Julius Jackson and the son of boxer Julian Jackson.

Career
At the PanAm Games in 2007, Jackson's first bout was against favorite Demetrius Andrade; Jackson was beaten in 5:23. At the 2007 World Championships he again lost in the first round, this time to Aliasker Bashirov. However, in the 2008 Olympic qualifiers, Jackson defeated Argentina's Diego Gabriel Chaves and Brazil's Pedro Lima, but lost to Carlos Banteaux of Cuba. These results qualified Jackson to compete in the 2008 Summer Olympics, where he scored a 4:2 upset victory over Magomed Nurutdinov before losing 0:10 to Kim Jung-Joo.

In 2009, Jackson moved into professional boxing. His professional record is 21 wins, with 16 coming via the way of knockout, and 4 losses.

Arrest
On February 6, 2019, the Virgin Islands Police Department arrested John Jackson and charged him with having sex with a 15-year-old girl. On 23 February, Jackson was also arrested by Homeland Security Investigations for the production of child pornography stemming from a sexual offense against a 15-year old girl. On April 18, 2019, Jackson was issued a ten-count indictment, charging him with two counts of production of child pornography, three counts of transportation of a minor with intent to engage in criminal sexual activity, one count of first-degree rape, and three counts of second-degree aggravated rape. Jackson was convicted on all charges in April 2022.

Professional boxing record

| style="text-align:center;" colspan="8"|21 Wins (16 Knockouts), 4 Losses (2 Knockouts), 0 Draws
|-  style="text-align:center; background:#e3e3e3;"
|  style="border-style:none none solid solid; "|Res.
|  style="border-style:none none solid solid; "|Record
|  style="border-style:none none solid solid; "|Opponent
|  style="border-style:none none solid solid; "|Type
|  style="border-style:none none solid solid; "|Rd., Time
|  style="border-style:none none solid solid; "|Date
|  style="border-style:none none solid solid; "|Location
|  style="border-style:none none solid solid; "|Notes
|- align=center
|Loss
|21–4
|align=left| Eric Walker
|
|
|
|align=left|
|
|- align=center
|Win
|21–3
|align=left| Lucio Galindo
|
|
|
|align=left|
|
|- align=center
|Loss
|20–3
|align=left| Jermell Charlo
|
|
|
|align=left|
|align=left|
|- align=center
|Win
|20–2
|align=left| Dennis Laurente
|
|
|
|align=left|
|
|- align=center
|Win
|19–2
|align=left| Carlos Adán Jerez
|
|
|
|align=left|
|align=left|
|- align=center
|Loss
|18–2
|align=left| Andy Lee
|
|
|
|align=left|
|align=left|
|- align=center
|Win 
|18–1
|align=left| Jorge Daniel Miranda
|
|
|
|align=left|
|align=left|
|- align=center
|Win
|17–1
|align=left| Tony Hirsch
|
|
|
|align=left|
|align=left|
|- align=center
|Win
|16–1
|align=left| Cerresso Fort
|
|
|
|align=left|
|align=left|
|- align=center
|Win
|15–1
|align=left| Alexis Pena
|
|
|
|align=left|
|align=left|
|- align=center
|Win
|14–1
|align=left| Alexander Hernandez
|
|
|
|align=left|
|align=left|
|- align=center
|Loss
|13–1
|align=left| Willie Nelson
|
|
|
|align=left|
|align=left|
|- align=center
|Win
|13–0
|align=left| Jesus Selig
|
|
|
|align=left|
|align=left|
|- align=center
|Win
|12–0
|align=left| KeAndrae Leatherwood
|
|
|
|align=left|
|align=left|
|- align=center
|Win
|11–0
|align=left| Jose Vidal Soto
|
|
|
|align=left|
|align=left|
|- align=center
|Win
|10–0
|align=left| Jack Welson
|
|
|
|align=left|
|align=left|
|- align=center
|Win
|9–0
|align=left| Carlos Andres Araya
|
|
|
|align=left|
|align=left|
|- align=center
|Win
|8–0
|align=left| Manuel Martinez
|
|
|
|align=left|
|align=left|
|- align=center
|Win
|7–0
|align=left| Valerio Marte
|
|
|
|align=left|
|align=left|
|- align=center
|Win
|6–0
|align=left| Alvaro Clinton Ayala
|
|
|
|align=left|
|align=left|
|- align=center
|Win
|5–0
|align=left| Rafael De la Cruz
|
|
|
|align=left|
|align=left|
|- align=center
|Win
|4–0
|align=left| Jonathan Illas Cordero
|
|
|
|align=left|
|align=left|
|- align=center
|Win
|3–0
|align=left| IIdefonso Soto
|
|
|
|align=left|
|align=left|
|- align=center
|Win
|2–0
|align=left| Steven Grove
|
|
|
|align=left|
|align=left|
|- align=center
|Win
|1–0
|align=left| Alphonso Alexander
|
|
|
|align=left|
|align=left|

References

External links

https://www.boxingscene.com/john-jackson-facing-15-years-indicted-on-sexual-offense-charges--138240
 Qualifier

John Jackson - Profile, News Archive & Current Rankings at Box.Live

Living people
People from Saint Thomas, U.S. Virgin Islands
United States Virgin Islands male boxers
1989 births
Boxers at the 2007 Pan American Games
Boxers at the 2008 Summer Olympics
Welterweight boxers
Pan American Games competitors for the United States Virgin Islands
Olympic boxers of the United States Virgin Islands
American male boxers